Saitis is a genus of jumping spiders that was first described by Eugène Louis Simon in 1876. The Australian species may belong to other genera, such as Maratus.

Species
 it contains thirty-two species, found worldwide:
Saitis annae Cockerell, 1894 – Jamaica
Saitis aranukanus Roewer, 1944 – Kiribati (Gilbert Is.)
Saitis ariadneae Logunov, 2001 – Greece (Crete)
Saitis auberti Berland, 1938 – Vanuatu
Saitis barbipes (Simon, 1868) (type) – Northern Africa, southern Europe to Turkey
Saitis berlandi Roewer, 1951 – Vanuatu
Saitis breviusculus Simon, 1901 – Gabon
Saitis catulus Simon, 1901 – Venezuela
Saitis chaperi Simon, 1885 – India, Sri Lanka
Saitis cupidon (Simon, 1885) – New Caledonia
Saitis cyanipes Simon, 1901 – Brazil
Saitis graecus Kulczyński, 1905 – Albania, Greece, Bulgaria
Saitis imitatus (Simon, 1868) – Croatia, Montenegro
Saitis insectus (Hogg, 1896) – Central Australia
Saitis insulanus Rainbow, 1920 – Australia (Lord Howe Is.)
Saitis kandyensis Kim, Ye & Oh, 2013 – Sri Lanka
Saitis lacustris Hickman, 1944 – Central Australia
Saitis latifrons Caporiacco, 1928 – Libya
Saitis magniceps (Keyserling, 1882) – Australia (Queensland)
Saitis marcusi Soares & Camargo, 1948 – Brazil
Saitis mutans Otto & Hill, 2012 – Australia (New South Wales)
Saitis nanus Soares & Camargo, 1948 – Brazil
Saitis perplexides (Strand, 1908) – Jamaica
Saitis relucens (Thorell, 1877) – Indonesia (Sulawesi)
Saitis sengleti (Metzner, 1999) – Greece (incl. Crete)
Saitis signatus (Keyserling, 1883) – Unknown
Saitis spinosus (Mello-Leitão, 1945) – Argentina
Saitis splendidus (Walckenaer, 1837) – Timor
Saitis taeniatus Keyserling, 1883 – Australia
Saitis tauricus Kulczyński, 1905 – Italy, Hungary, Macedonia, Bulgaria, Greece, Turkey, Ukraine
Saitis variegatus Mello-Leitão, 1941 – Argentina
Saitis virgatus Otto & Hill, 2012 – Australia (New South Wales)

References

External links
 Photograph of S. barbipes

Further reading
 

 
Salticidae genera
Salticidae
Spiders of Africa
Spiders of Asia
Spiders of Oceania
Spiders of South America